Pavel Vladimirovich Krasheninnikov (born 21 June 1964 in Polevskoy, Sverdlovsk Oblast, Soviet Union) is a Russian jurist and politician.

From 1998 to August 1999 (Sergei Kiriyenko's Cabinet, Yevgeny Primakov's Cabinet, Sergei Stepashin's Cabinet) he was Justice Minister of Russia.

Since 1999 he has been a Deputy of the State Duma, at first from Union of Rightist Forces and later joined United Russia.

References and notes

External links

Russian lawyers
Justice ministers of Russia
Union of Right Forces politicians
United Russia politicians
Living people
Recipients of the Order "For Merit to the Fatherland", 3rd class
21st-century Russian politicians
1964 births
Ural State Law University alumni
Third convocation members of the State Duma (Russian Federation)
Fourth convocation members of the State Duma (Russian Federation)
Fifth convocation members of the State Duma (Russian Federation)
Sixth convocation members of the State Duma (Russian Federation)
Seventh convocation members of the State Duma (Russian Federation)
Eighth convocation members of the State Duma (Russian Federation)
People from Polevskoy